Muriel Segal is an English author and journalist.

She was born in London, but educated in New York City, Sydney and Paris.  She worked on a farm in New Zealand and while there became a foreign correspondent and also a founder of the Women's Press Club.

Bibliography
 Men and Marriage, Michael Joseph, London, 1970 
 Dolly on the dais: the artist's model in perspective Gentry Books, 1972. 
 Painted ladies; models of the great artists, Stein and Day, New Youk, 1972, 
 Virgins reluctant, dubious & avowed, London, R. Hale, 1978,

External links
 Review of Virgins, reluctant, dubious and avowed.

Year of birth missing (living people)
Living people
English journalists